Hallie Meyers-Shyer (born July 26, 1987) is an American actress and filmmaker.

Early life 
Meyers-Shyer was born in Los Angeles, California, the daughter of filmmakers Nancy Meyers and Charles Shyer. She has an older sister, Annie. Meyers-Shyer is Jewish. She attended Crossroads School and later enrolled at the University of Southern California to study screenwriting, but transferred to The New School, where she graduated with a degree in literature.

Career 
Meyers-Shyer has appeared in six of her parents' films: Father of the Bride,  I Love Trouble, Father of the Bride Part II, The Parent Trap, What Women Want, and The Affair of the Necklace. The lead characters in The Parent Trap were named after Meyers-Shyer and her sister, Annie Meyers-Shyer.

In 2012, it was announced that Meyers-Shyer's script The Chelsea would be made into a film starring Felicity Jones and directed by Nancy Meyers. In 2017, Meyers said her daughter's project ran into casting problems, and Meyers-Shyer "just moved on from it."

In 2017, she made her directorial debut with the romantic comedy film Home Again. The film starred Reese Witherspoon as a 40-year-old single mother who allows three young aspiring filmmakers (Pico Alexander, Nat Wolff, and Jon Rudnitsky) to live with her in her Los Angeles home. Candice Bergen and Michael Sheen also star in the film. The film was released on September 8, 2017, by Open Road Films, and grossed $37 million worldwide.

References

External links
 

Living people
1987 births
Jewish American actresses
American women film directors
American film actresses
American child actresses
Film directors from Los Angeles
21st-century American Jews
21st-century American women